Laemostenus janthinus is a species of ground beetle in the subfamily of Harpalinae.

Subspecies
 Laemostenus janthinus coeruleus (Dejean, 1828) 
 Laemostenus janthinus janthinus (Duftschmid, 1812)

Description
It is a nocturnal predator of other small arthropods.

Distribution
This species can be found in Austria, Bosnia, Croatia, France, Italy, Poland, Slovenia and Switzerland.

Habitat
This species inhabits forests and Alpine prairies at an elevation of 2000–2400 meters above sea level.

References

Beetles described in 1812
Harpalinae